Bergenia stracheyi is a plant species in the genus Bergenia found in the Western Himalayas, from 2700 to 4700 m, Afghanistan and Tajikistan.

Bergenin and norbergenin are chemical compounds that can be isolated from rhizomes of B. stracheyi.

Cultivars
 Bergenia stracheyi 'Alba'''
 Bergenia stracheyi 'Afghanica'''

References

External links

stracheyi
Plants described in 1868